Linden Park may refer to:
Linden Park Cricket Club in Kent, England
Linden Park, Massachusetts in Brookline
Linden Park, South Australia, a suburb of Adelaide
Linden Park, Queens, a park in the Corona neighborhood of Queens, New York